In Euclidean geometry, a parallelogram is a simple (non-self-intersecting) quadrilateral with two pairs of parallel sides. The opposite or facing sides of a parallelogram are of equal length and the opposite angles of a parallelogram are of equal measure. The congruence of opposite sides and opposite angles is a direct consequence of the Euclidean parallel postulate and neither condition can be proven without appealing to the Euclidean parallel postulate or one of its equivalent formulations.

By comparison, a quadrilateral with just one pair of parallel sides is a trapezoid in American English or a trapezium in British English.

The three-dimensional counterpart of a parallelogram is a parallelepiped.

The etymology (in Greek παραλληλ-όγραμμον, parallēl-ógrammon, a shape "of parallel lines") reflects the definition.

Special cases
Rectangle – A parallelogram with four angles of equal size (right angles).
Rhombus – A parallelogram with four sides of equal length. Any parallelogram that is neither a rectangle nor a rhombus was traditionally called a rhomboid but this term is not used in modern mathematics.
Square – A parallelogram with four sides of equal length and angles of equal size (right angles).

Characterizations
A simple (non-self-intersecting) quadrilateral is a parallelogram if and only if any one of the following statements is true:
Two pairs of opposite sides are parallel (by definition).
Two pairs of opposite sides are equal in length.
Two pairs of opposite angles are equal in measure.
The diagonals bisect each other.
One pair of opposite sides is parallel and equal in length.
Adjacent angles are supplementary.
Each diagonal divides the quadrilateral into two congruent triangles.
The sum of the squares of the sides equals the sum of the squares of the diagonals. (This is the parallelogram law.)
It has rotational symmetry of order 2.
The sum of the distances from any interior point to the sides is independent of the location of the point. (This is an extension of Viviani's theorem.)
There is a point X in the plane of the quadrilateral with the property that every straight line through X divides the quadrilateral into two regions of equal area.
Thus all parallelograms have all the properties listed above, and conversely, if just one of these statements is true in a simple quadrilateral, then it is a parallelogram.

Other properties

Opposite sides of a parallelogram are parallel (by definition) and so will never intersect.
The area of a parallelogram is twice the area of a triangle created by one of its diagonals.
The area of a parallelogram is also equal to the magnitude of the vector cross product of two adjacent sides.
Any line through the midpoint of a parallelogram bisects the area.
Any non-degenerate affine transformation takes a parallelogram to another parallelogram.
A parallelogram has rotational symmetry of order 2 (through 180°) (or order 4 if a square). If it also has exactly two lines of reflectional symmetry then it must be a rhombus or an oblong (a non-square rectangle). If it has four lines of reflectional symmetry, it is a square.
The perimeter of a parallelogram is 2(a + b) where a and b are the lengths of adjacent sides.
Unlike any other convex polygon, a parallelogram cannot be inscribed in any triangle with less than twice its area.
The centers of four squares all constructed either internally or externally on the sides of a parallelogram are the vertices of a square.
If two lines parallel to sides of a parallelogram are constructed concurrent to a diagonal, then the parallelograms formed on opposite sides of that diagonal are equal in area.
The diagonals of a parallelogram divide it into four triangles of equal area.

Area formula

All of the area formulas for general convex quadrilaterals apply to parallelograms. Further formulas are specific to parallelograms:

A parallelogram with base b and height h can be divided into a trapezoid and a right triangle, and rearranged into a rectangle, as shown in the figure to the left. This means that the area of a parallelogram is the same as that of a rectangle with the same base and height:

The base × height area formula can also be derived using the figure to the right. The area K of the parallelogram to the right (the blue area) is the total area of the rectangle less the area of the two orange triangles. The area of the rectangle is

and the area of a single triangle is

Therefore, the area of the parallelogram is

Another area formula, for two sides B and C and angle θ, is

The area of a parallelogram with sides B and C (B ≠ C) and angle  at the intersection of the diagonals is given by

When the parallelogram is specified from the lengths B and C of two adjacent sides together with the length D1 of either diagonal, then the area can be found from Heron's formula. Specifically it is

where  and the leading factor 2 comes from the fact that the chosen diagonal divides the parallelogram into two congruent triangles.

Area in terms of Cartesian coordinates of vertices
Let vectors  and let  denote the matrix with elements of a and b.

Let vectors  and let .

Let points . Then the area of the parallelogram with vertices at a, b and c is equivalent to the absolute value of the determinant of a matrix built using a, b and c as rows with the last column padded using ones as follows:

Proof that diagonals bisect each other

To prove that the diagonals of a parallelogram bisect each other, we will use congruent triangles:
 (alternate interior angles are equal in measure)
  (alternate interior angles are equal in measure).

(since these are angles that a transversal makes with parallel lines AB and DC).

Also, side AB is equal in length to side DC, since opposite sides of a parallelogram are equal in length.

Therefore, triangles ABE and CDE are congruent (ASA postulate, two corresponding angles and the included side).

Therefore,

Since the diagonals AC and BD divide each other into segments of equal length, the diagonals bisect each other.

Separately, since the diagonals AC and BD bisect each other at point E, point E is the midpoint of each diagonal.

Lattice of parallelograms
Parallelograms can tile the plane by translation. If edges are equal, or angles are right, the symmetry of the lattice is higher. These represent the four Bravais lattices in 2 dimensions.

Parallelograms arising from other figures

Automedian triangle

An automedian triangle is one whose medians are in the same proportions as its sides (though in a different order). If ABC is an automedian triangle in which vertex A stands opposite the side a,  G is the centroid (where the three medians of ABC intersect), and AL is one of the extended medians of ABC with L lying on the circumcircle of ABC, then BGCL is a parallelogram.

Varignon parallelogram

The midpoints of the sides of an arbitrary quadrilateral are the vertices of a parallelogram, called its Varignon parallelogram. If the quadrilateral is convex or concave (that is, not self-intersecting), then the area of the Varignon parallelogram is half the area of the quadrilateral.

Tangent parallelogram of an ellipse

For an ellipse, two diameters are said to be conjugate if and only if the tangent line to the ellipse at an endpoint of one diameter is parallel to the other diameter. Each pair of conjugate diameters of an ellipse has a corresponding tangent parallelogram, sometimes called a bounding parallelogram, formed by the tangent lines to the ellipse at the four endpoints of the conjugate diameters. All tangent parallelograms for a given ellipse have the same area.

It is possible to reconstruct an ellipse from any pair of conjugate diameters, or from any tangent parallelogram.

Faces of a parallelepiped

A parallelepiped is a three-dimensional figure whose six faces are parallelograms.

See also
Fundamental parallelogram (disambiguation)
Antiparallelogram
 Levi-Civita parallelogramoid

References

External links

Parallelogram and Rhombus - Animated course (Construction, Circumference, Area)

Interactive Parallelogram --sides, angles and slope
Area of Parallelogram at cut-the-knot
Equilateral Triangles On Sides of a Parallelogram at cut-the-knot
Definition and properties of a parallelogram with animated applet
Interactive applet showing parallelogram area calculation interactive applet

Types of quadrilaterals
Elementary shapes